Constantine Bodin (Bulgarian and , Konstantin Bodin;  1072–1101) was a medieval king and the ruler of Duklja, the most powerful Serbian principality of the time, from 1081 to 1101, succeeding his father, Mihailo Vojislavljević ( 1046–1081). Born in peaceful times, when the South Slavs were subjects of the Byzantine Empire, his father was in 1072 approached by Bulgarian nobility, who sought aid in their revolt against the Byzantines; Mihailo sent them Bodin, who was crowned Bulgarian tsar under the name Petar III (Petŭr III) joined the short-lived revolt, being captured the following year after initial success. He was freed in 1078, and upon the death of his father in 1081 he succeeded to the throne of Dioclea. Having renewed his acknowledgement of Byzantine overlordship, he soon sided with their enemies, the Normans, which resulted in a Byzantine invasion and his capture. Although he quickly had himself freed, his reputation and influence waned. He was pushed aside by one of his governors, Vukan, who continued the struggle against the Byzantines.

Early life
Bodin was the son of Mihailo, the ˝King of the Slavs˝, who held the Byzantine title of protospatharios. His mother was the niece of Byzantine Emperor Constantine IX Monomachos (r. 1042–1055). His father was more of a politician and statesman than warrior. Energetic and ambitious, Bodin was brought up in a period when the state enjoyed rare peace for two decades, although this did not interfere with his development of warrior qualities and abilities. He participated in the large revolt that broke out in Pomoravlje and Povardarje against the Byzantines in 1072–73.

Uprising against the Byzantines (1072–73)

Mihailo was approached by Bulgarian nobles (proechontes) led by Georgi Voyteh, who asked for a son whom they could crown as their emperor and end Byzantine "oppression". In the fall of 1072, Mihailo obliged and sent Bodin with 300 troops to Prizren, where they met with Georgi Voiteh, the exarch of Skopje, and other magnates. They proclaimed him emperor of the Bulgarians and renamed him Petar. It is theorized that Bodin was the great-grandson of Samuel of Bulgaria. Bodin was thus put at the command of the Bulgarian Slavs against the Byzantines (Greeks). The revolt, fought by the "Slavic people" (according to Bryennios) broke out in the theme of Bulgaria. It is possible that it was aided by the Hungarians. The aid to Georgi Voiteh moved Mihailo away from the Byzantines.

In the meantime, the Byzantine doux of Skopje, Nikephoros Karantenos, marched towards Prizren with an army, but was replaced prior to the battle with Damian Dalassenos, who destroyed the morale of the army that would fight the Serbian contingent. The Serb army in Kosovo was split into two groups that would organize the uprising: the first was led by Bodin and operated in Pomoravlje, heading for Niš, while his second-in-command Vojvoda Petrilo operated in Povardarje, heading for Kastoria via Ohrid. Petrilo headed south and took Ohrid without a battle, and then Devol, but suffered a defeat at Kastoria, where Byzantine Slavic Boris David commanded a Bulgarian contingent and defeated Petrilo, sending him fleeing "through inaccessible mountains". The troops of Bodin took Niš and started plundering the region, abusing his 'subjects', which was seen by Voiteh as Bodin being greedier than Michael VII, and when the Byzantines under Saronites marched onto Skopje, Bodin showed no concern, making Voiteh surrender without resistance. A Byzantine garrison was installed at Skopje, and Saronites headed for Niš. In order to prevent the retreat to Zeta being cut off, Bodin also retreated from Niš, but clashed with the Byzantines in Kosovo, where he was defeated and captured. Despite some initial success Bodin was captured at Pauni in southern Kosovo, and then sent to Constantinople, then Antioch, where he spent several years. Voiteh died en route. When Mihailo heard of the capture of his son, he sent his son-in-law and former captive, the Byzantine general Longibardopoulos, to rescue Bodin, but instead, Longibardopoulos upon arriving defected to the Byzantines. When unrest began in Antioch, Mihailo paid some Venetian merchants who freed Bodin and took him home. Upon his return, it seems, Bodin became a co-ruler of his father.

Co-rule
Soon after his return, the Byzantines attacked, forcing Mihailo and Bodin to temporarily acknowledge Byzantine overlordship. When, in 1081, the Normans crossed from Italy and attacked the Byzantines and besieged Dyrrhachion, Emperor Alexios I Komnenos went against them and called Bodin for aid. Bodin arrived with a Serb detachment; however, during the Battle of Dyrrhachion (18 October), he stayed aside with his army, intending to await the outcome of the battle. When the Byzantines were defeated and started to flee, Bodin retreated with his army.

Reign

After the death of King Mihailo, Bodin inherited the Dukljan throne. By this time Bodin was a mature man with a turbulent background and great experiences, also having been a co-ruler of his father for several years.

Bodin's disengagement at Dyrrhachion outraged Constantinople, relations further deteriorating when Bodin began fully supporting the Normans. The Byzantines, after dealing with the Normans, attacked Bodin, defeated him and once again had him imprisoned. He quickly had himself freed, but after this his reputation began to fall and influence to wane.

The focus of the Serbian national and state life were then transmitted in the 1090s to the mountains of Kopaonik, where his subject, župan (count) Vukan, played the most important role in the fight of the Serbs against the Byzantine Empire. Bodin was pushed to the background, contributed by the dynastic conflicts and his struggle against Dubrovnik, which brought him only little fame and success. Thus, Bodin, who had started his career with much enthusiasm and energy, ended his life and reign without power and reputation.

By 1085, he and his brothers had suppressed a revolt by their cousins, the sons of Mihailo's brother Radoslav in the župa of Zeta, and Bodin then ruled unchallenged.  In spite of his earlier opposition to the Byzantine Empire, Bodin at first supported the Byzantines against the attack of Robert Guiscard and his Normans on Durazzo in 1081, but then stood idle, allowing the Normans to take the city.

At about this time, Bodin married Jaquinta, the daughter of Argyritzos, a nobleman from Bari forced into exile in Duklja. Constantine Bodin's relations with the west included his support for Pope Urban II in 1089, which secured him a major concession, the upgrading of his bishop of Bar to the rank of an archbishop. Despite Bodin's submission to Rome, the Catholic Church only gained ground in coastal areas of his realm, while the inland parts remained under Constantinople.

Constantine Bodin attempted to maintain the enlarged realm left him by his father. To do so, he campaigned in Bosnia and Rascia, installing his relative Stephen as knez in Bosnia and his nephews Vukan and Marko as župans in Rascia. The two brothers were sons of Constantine Bodin's half-brother Petrislav, who had governed Raška in  1060–1074. However, after the death of Robert Guiscard in 1085, Constantine Bodin was faced by the hostility of the Byzantine Empire, which recovered Durazzo and prepared to punish the king of Duklja for siding with the Normans.

The Byzantine campaign against Duklja is dated between 1089 and 1091 and may have succeeded in taking Bodin captive for the second time. Although the kingdom survived, outlying territories including Bosnia, Rascia, and Hum seceded under their own governors.  Exactly what happened in Duklja is unknown, and there may have been a civil war during Bodin's possible captivity. Queen Jaquinta ruthlessly persecuted possible claimants to the throne, including Bodin's cousin Branislav and his family. After a number of these persons were killed or exiled by Bodin and his wife, the church managed to keep the impending blood feud from sparking off a full-blown civil war.

In the winter of 1096–97 the Crusaders under Raymond of Toulouse met Bodin at Scutari, the Crusaders were hospitably received and entertained.

On Constantine Bodin's death in 1101 or possibly 1108, Duklja was engulfed in the conflict caused by the dynastic strife that had begun to develop during his reign.

Titles
His seal, during his vassalage under Alexios I Komnenos (r. 1081–1118), dating to the early years of his rule, has the face of St. Theodore, and the Greek writing saying:  — "Konstantin, protosebastos and authority of Dioklea and Serbia".
Anna Komnene (1083–1153) calls him "Exarch of Serbia".
The seal of Constantine's son, Đorđe, reads in Latin: "Geor(gius) regis Bodini filius", with the reverse depicting the image and Greek name of St. George, ὀ ἅγιος Γεώργι(ο)ς).

Family

Constantine Bodin married Jaquinta, the daughter of the Norman governor of Bari. They had several children, among whom were sons:

 Mihailo II, titular king of Duklja ca. 1101-1102
 Đorđe, titular king of Duklja ca. 1118 and 1125–1127
 Argaric

Annotations

References

Sources
Primary sources
 
 
 

Secondary sources
 
 
 
 
 
 
 
 
 
 
 
 

11th-century births
1101 deaths
11th-century Serbian monarchs
11th-century Byzantine people
11th-century Bulgarian emperors
Vojislavljević dynasty
Eastern Orthodox monarchs
Rulers of Duklja
Medieval Serbian people of Greek descent
Byzantine people of Slavic descent
Byzantine Dalmatia
Byzantine Serbia
Medieval rebels
Byzantine rebels
Serbian people of Bulgarian descent
Protosebastoi
Montenegrin Roman Catholics
Serbian Roman Catholics
Christian monarchs